Evergreen Hill is a historic home and farm and national historic district located in Centre Township, St. Joseph County, Indiana.  The house was built in 1873, and is a two-story, Italianate style balloon frame dwelling with a -story kitchen addition. A sunroom was added in 1918. It has a low-pitched hipped roof and is sheathed in clapboard siding.  Also on the property are the contributing large frame shed, smokehouse, English barn, garage, and small family cemetery.

It was listed on the National Register of Historic Places in 2001.

References

Historic districts on the National Register of Historic Places in Indiana
Farms on the National Register of Historic Places in Indiana
Italianate architecture in Indiana
Houses completed in 1873
Historic districts in St. Joseph County, Indiana
National Register of Historic Places in St. Joseph County, Indiana